Huayi Brothers Media Corp. is a Chinese multinational entertainment company that owns a film studio, a television production company, a talent agency, a record label, and a movie theater chain founded in Beijing, Shanghai, Hong Kong, Macau, & Taipei by Dennis Wang Zhongjun and James Wang Zhonglei in 1994. The company made world news on October 30, 2009, when the Shenzhen Stock Exchange ChiNext Board was halted, after HBMC's stock price reached 122.74 percent above its IPO price, to open at 63.66 yuan per share. Patrick Frater of Variety called it "China’s largest private sector film conglomerate". In 2014, the company was the seventh-largest film distributor in China, with 2.26% of the market.

History
The company was founded in 1994 as a film production company. It underwent a comprehensive expansion into the media industry through investing and now produces movies, TV shows, & music and operates a film studio, TV production company, a talent agency, a record label, and movie theaters.
In February 2011, Huayi Brothers revealed their plans to create the largest TV and film studio complex in East Asia. Also, they announced that they aim to earn 10 billion yuan in the box office by 2016. As of April 2015, the company was worth US$7.9 billion.

In 2014 the company announced that it had agreed to invest as much as $150 million in Studio, the production company launched by former Warner Bros. executive Jeff Robinov, but Shanghai-based conglomerate Fosun International later signed a deal to invest in Robinov's company instead. The same year the company acquired 79% stake in GDC Technology Limited, a Digital Cinema solutions provider,  which was held by private equity funds Carlyle Group and Yunfeng Capital.

Around 2019, after the delay of The Eight Hundred due to censorship, the company created a novel Chinese Communist Party committee so that “correct political orientation ... [would] mix the core socialist values of the party deeper into the company’s blood”.

Artists

Duan Yihong
Fei
Feng Shaofeng
Pace Wu
Li Bing Bing
Lu Ning 
He Zhuoyan
Zhou Xun (2005-2010)
Yao Chen
Wang Luoyong
Vision Wei Chen
Wang Zhuocheng

Productions

TV series

Films

Talent agency
HBMC manages over 100 Chinese A-list celebrities of movie, music and TV. Xun Zhou, Angelababy, Kun Chen, Zhao Wei and Shu Qi have appeared in Huayi productions.

See also
 C-pop

References

External links
  

Chinese record labels
Talent agencies of mainland China
Pop record labels
Sibling filmmakers
Entertainment companies established in 1994
Film production companies of China
1994 establishments in China
Companies based in Beijing
Companies listed on the Shenzhen Stock Exchange
Chinese brands
Entertainment companies of China
Television production companies of China
Cinemas and movie theaters in China